Picric acid is an organic compound with the formula (O2N)3C6H2OH. Its IUPAC name is  2,4,6-trinitrophenol (TNP). It is one of the most acidic phenols. Like other strongly nitrated organic compounds, picric acid is an explosive, which is its primary use. It has also been used as medicine (antiseptic, burn treatments) and as a dye.

History 
Picric acid was probably first mentioned in the alchemical writings of Johann Rudolf Glauber. Initially, it was made by nitrating substances such as animal horn, silk, indigo, and natural resin, the synthesis from indigo first being performed by Peter Woulfe during 1771. The German chemist Justus von Liebig had named picric acid  (rendered in French as ). Picric acid was given that name by the French chemist Jean-Baptiste Dumas in 1841. Its synthesis from phenol, and the correct determination of its formula, were accomplished during 1841. In 1799, French chemist Jean-Joseph Welter (1763–1852) produced picric acid by treating silk with nitric acid; he found that potassium picrate could explode. Not until 1830 did chemists think to use picric acid as an explosive. Before then, chemists assumed that only the salts of picric acid were explosive, not the acid itself. In 1871 Hermann Sprengel proved it could be detonated and afterwards most military powers used picric acid as their main high explosive material.

Picric acid was the first strongly explosive nitrated organic compound widely considered suitable to withstand the shock of firing in conventional artillery. Nitroglycerine and nitrocellulose (guncotton) were available earlier but shock sensitivity sometimes caused detonation in an artillery barrel at the time of firing. In 1885, based on research of Hermann Sprengel, French chemist Eugène Turpin patented the use of pressed and cast picric acid in blasting charges and artillery shells. In 1887 the French government adopted a mixture of picric acid and guncotton with the name Melinite. In 1888, Britain started manufacturing a very similar mixture in Lydd, Kent, with the name Lyddite. Japan followed with an alternative stabilization approach known as Shimose powder which, instead of attempting to stabilize the material itself, instead removed its contact with metal by coating the inside of the shells with layers of ceramic and wax. In 1889, a mixture of ammonium cresylate with trinitrocresol, or an ammonium salt of trinitrocresol, started to be manufactured with the name Ecrasite in Austria-Hungary. By 1894 Russia was manufacturing artillery shells filled with picric acid. Ammonium picrate (known as Dunnite or explosive D) was used by the United States beginning in 1906. However, shells filled with picric acid become unstable if the compound reacts with metal shell or fuze casings to form metal picrates which are more sensitive than the parent phenol. The sensitivity of picric acid was demonstrated by the Halifax Explosion.

Picric acid was used in the Battle of Omdurman, the Second Boer War, the Russo-Japanese War, and World War I. Germany began filling artillery shells with Trinitrotoluene (TNT) in 1902. Toluene was less readily available than phenol, and TNT is less powerful than picric acid, but improved safety of munitions manufacturing and storage caused the replacement of picric acid by TNT for most military purposes between the World Wars.

Efforts to control the availability of phenol, the precursor to picric acid, emphasize its importance in World War I.  Germans are reported to have bought US supplies of phenol and converted it to acetylsalicylic acid, i.e., aspirin, to keep it from the Allies. (See Great Phenol Plot.) At the time, phenol was obtained from coal as a co-product of coke ovens and the manufacture of gas for gas lighting. Laclede Gas reports being asked to expand production of phenol (and toluene) to assist the war effort. Both Monsanto and Dow Chemical began manufacturing synthetic phenol in 1915, with Dow being the main producer. Dow describes picric acid as "the main battlefield explosive used by the French. Large amounts [of phenol] also went to Japan, where it was made into picric acid sold to the Russians."

Thomas Edison needed phenol to manufacture phonograph records. He responded by undertaking production of phenol at his Silver Lake, NJ, facility using processes developed by his chemists. He built two plants with a capacity of six tons of phenol per day. Production began the first week of September, one month after hostilities began in Europe. He built two plants to produce raw material benzene at Johnstown, PA, and Bessemer, AL, replacing supplies previously from Germany. Edison also manufactured aniline dyes, which had previously been supplied by the German dye trust. Other wartime products include xylene, p-phenylenediamine, shellac, and pyrax. Wartime shortages made these ventures profitable. In 1915, his production capacity was fully committed by midyear.

Synthesis 
The aromatic ring of phenol is activated towards electrophilic substitution reactions, and attempted nitration of phenol, even with dilute nitric acid, results in the formation of high molecular weight tars. In order to minimize these side reactions, anhydrous phenol is sulfonated with fuming sulfuric acid, and the resulting p-hydroxyphenylsulfonic acid is then nitrated with concentrated nitric acid. During this reaction, nitro groups are introduced, and the sulfonic acid group is displaced. The reaction is highly exothermic, and careful temperature control is required. Another method of picric acid synthesis is direct nitration of 2,4-Dinitrophenol with nitric acid. It crystallizes in the orthorhombic space group Pca21 with a = 9.13 Å, b = 18.69 Å, c = 9.79 Å and α = β = γ = 90°.

Uses 
By far the greatest use has been in munitions and explosives. Explosive D, also known as Dunnite, is the ammonium salt of picric acid. Dunnite is more powerful but less stable than the more common explosive TNT (which is produced in a similar process to picric acid but with toluene as the feedstock). Picramide, formed by aminating picric acid (typically beginning with Dunnite), can be further aminated to produce the very stable explosive TATB.

It has found some use in organic chemistry for the preparation of crystalline salts of organic bases (picrates) for the purpose of identification and characterization.

Optical metallography 
In metallurgy, a 4% picric acid in ethanol etch termed "picral" has been commonly used in optical metallography to reveal prior austenite grain boundaries in ferritic steels.  The hazards associated with picric acid have meant it has largely been replaced with other chemical etchants. However, it is still used to etch magnesium alloys, such as AZ31.

Histology 
Bouin solution is a common picric-acid-containing fixative solution used for histology specimens. It improves the staining of acid dyes, but it can also result in hydrolysis of any DNA in the sample.

Picric acid is used in the preparation of Picrosirius Red, a histological stain for collagen.

Blood tests 
Clinical chemistry laboratory testing utilizes picric acid for the Jaffe reaction to test for creatinine. It forms a colored complex that can be measured using spectroscopy.

Picric acid forms red isopurpurate with hydrogen cyanide (HCN).  By photometric measurement of the resulting dye picric acid can be used to quantify hydrogen cyanide.

During the early 20th century, picric acid was used to measure blood glucose levels. When glucose, picric acid and sodium carbonate are combined and heated, a characteristic red color forms. With a calibrating glucose solution, the red color can be used to measure the glucose levels added. This is known as the Lewis and Benedict method of measuring glucose.

Skin dye 
Much less commonly, wet picric acid has been used as a skin dye, or temporary branding agent. It reacts with proteins in the skin to give a dark brown color that may last as long as a month.

Antiseptic 
During the early 20th century, picric acid was stocked in pharmacies as an antiseptic and as a treatment for burns, malaria, herpes, and smallpox. Picric acid-soaked gauze was also commonly stocked in first aid kits from that period as a burn treatment.  It was notably used for the treatment of burns suffered by victims of the Hindenburg disaster in 1937. Picric acid was also used as a treatment for trench foot suffered by soldiers stationed on the Western Front during World War I.

Picric acid has been used for many years by fly tyers to dye mole skins and feathers a dark olive green for use as fishing lures. Its popularity has been tempered by its toxic nature.

Safety
Modern safety precautions recommend storing picric acid wet, to minimize the danger of explosion. Dry picric acid is relatively sensitive to shock and friction, so laboratories that use it store it in bottles under a layer of water, rendering it safe. Glass or plastic bottles are required, as picric acid can easily form metal picrate salts that are even more sensitive and hazardous than the acid itself. Industrially, picric acid is especially hazardous because it is volatile and slowly sublimes even at room temperature.  Over time, the buildup of picrates on exposed metal surfaces can constitute an explosion hazard.

Picric acid gauze, if found in antique first aid kits, presents a safety hazard because picric acid of that vintage (60–90 years old) will have become crystallized and unstable, and may have formed metal picrates from long storage in a metal first aid case.

Bomb disposal units are often called to dispose of picric acid if it has dried out. In the United States there was an effort to remove dried picric acid containers from high school laboratories during the 1980s. 

Munitions containing picric acid may be found in sunken warships. The buildup of metal picrates over time renders them shock-sensitive and extremely hazardous. It is recommended that shipwrecks that contain such munitions not be disturbed in any way. The hazard may subside when the shells become corroded enough to admit seawater as these materials are water-soluble. Currently there are various fluorescent probes to sense and detect picric acid in very minute quantity.

See also
Shellite (explosive), an explosive containing picric acid, formerly used in naval shells.
Table of explosive detonation velocities
RE factor
Verhoeff's stain
Styphnic acid

References

Further reading
 
 
 Cooper, Paul W., Explosives Engineering, New York: Wiley-VCH, 1996.  

 CDC - NIOSH Pocket Guide to Chemical Hazards

Explosive chemicals
Nitrophenols
Organic acids